Elbow fractures are any broken bone around the elbow joint.They include among others:
 Olecranon fractures
 Supracondylar humerus fractures
 Radial head fractures

The terrible triad of the elbow (not to be confused with the terrible triad of the knee) is a combination of:
 A fracture of the head of radius
 A fracture of the coronoid process of the ulna
 Humeroulnar dislocation (generally posterior or posterolateral)
The terrible triad of the elbow is confers joint instability and a major risk of developing osteoarthritis.

References

Bone fractures
Medical triads